In American usage, a publication's masthead is a printed list, published in a fixed position in each edition, of its owners, departments, officers, contributors and address details, which in British English usage is known as imprint.

In the UK and many other Commonwealth nations, "the masthead" is a publication's designed title as it appears on the front page: what, in American English, is known as the nameplate or "flag".

See also 
 Colophon (publishing)
 Impressum
 Indicia (publishing)

References

External links 
Examples of mastheads for digital magazines:
 Vogue (magazine): https://www.vogue.com/masthead/
 Fast Company: https://www.fastcompany.com/staff-masthead
 National Geographic: https://www.nationalgeographic.com/magazine/masthead/
 Scientific American: https://www.scientificamerican.com/pressroom/masthead/

Publishing